T Takes is a 2008 Internet-exclusive 12-part series of two- to three-minutes episodic film series, each episode starring a different actor improvising for the camera. Shot during the 2008 Sundance International Film Festival by writer and director Brody Baker and produced by KnowMore Productions exclusively for The New York Times Style Magazine web site, these 12 short films were conceived to be viewed sequentially and feature performances by Hollywood's bright young things, including Josh Hartnett, Josh Lucas, Michael Pitt and Lukas Haas.

T Takes is followed by T Takes: Brooklyn ‘09.

Production
T Takes director Brody Baker's inspiration for this series of short films came from his personal experience at the motel where the series was shot, the Viking Lodge in Heber City. Baker and his crew  traveled to Utah two days before the 2008 Sundance International Film Festival started on behalf of The New York Times Style Magazine with the goal of enlisting mainstream and indie film actors to take a break from the screenings and the slopes in Park City, Utah, to improvise a series of linked, episodic short films. They scouted the Viking Lodge their first day in Utah. A few nights before and during the shoot, Baker stayed there to write. The motel was always very, very quiet, eerily quiet. The placidity of the silence of the Utah mountains gave the New Yorker Baker anxiety. While he was at the motel, he always felt like he was waiting for something he could not define. The anticipation Baker felt influenced the narration and tone of the shorts. Baker was also influenced by Robert Plutchik’s study of the "eight primary emotions" - sadness, anger, fear, disgust, curiosity, joy, surprise and acceptance - and used this study for reference. The lensing of T Takes lasted about six or seven shooting days. At the most four shorts were shot in a day, sometimes one a day. Baker and his crew generally had an hour at most with each actor. The actors were never on set at the same time. Baker wrote script outlines for each short prior to shooting. He wanted the process to be an equal collaboration between the actor and him. "When each actor arrived to the set, we would talk about my ideas and go from there, back and forth until we started shooting. As they improvised they might change something from what we originally spoke about and then lead the story in a different direction. It was basically like a relay race. I give them the baton, tell them where to run, then they’d hand it back and tell me where to run."

Series
 Episode 1 - T Takes: Lobby
 starring: Josh Hartnett as Josh, the unexpected guest
release date: March 17, 2008
running time: 3 min. 23 sec.
 Episode 2 - T Takes: Room 111
 starring: Morena Baccarin as the guest in room 111
release date: March 18, 2008
running time: 4 min. 04 sec.
 Episode 3 - T Takes: Room 128
 starring: Andre Royo as the guest in room 128
release date: March 19, 2008
running time: 3 min. 02 sec.
 Episode 4 - T Takes: Room 225
 starring: Brady Corbet as the son of the guest in room 225
release date: March 20, 2008
running time: 3 min. 14 sec.
 Episode 5 - T Takes: Room 102
 starring: Michael Stahl-David as the guest in room 102
release date: March 21, 2008
running time: 2 min.26 sec.
 Episode 6 - T Takes: Room 117
 starring: Saffron Burrows as the guest in room 117
release date: March 24, 2008
running time: 3 min. 19 sec.
 Episode 7 - T Takes: Room 108
 starring: Lukas Haas as the guest in room 108
release date: March 25, 2008
running time: 4 min. 02 sec.
 Episode 8 - T Takes: Room 207
 starring: Mark Webber as the guest in room 207
release date: March 26, 2008
running time: 4 min. 59 sec.
 Episode 9 - T Takes: Room 23
 starring: Jason Ritter as the guest in room 23
release date: March 27, 2008
running time: 2 min. 17 sec.
 Episode 10 - T Takes: Room 115
 starring: Josh Lucas as the guest in room 115
release date: March 28, 2008
running time: 3 min. 40 sec.
 Episode 11 - T Takes: Room 113
 starring: Michael Pitt as the guest in room 113
release date: March 31, 2008
running time: 2 min. 28 sec.
 Episode 12 - T Takes: Room 107
 starring: Athena Currey as the guest in room 107
release date: April 1, 2008
running time: 2 min. 32 sec.

Release
The New York Times Style Magazine web site launched the first episode in T Takes online on March 17, 2008. In the official press release, Stefano Tonchi, editor of T: The New York Times Style Magazine said "The T Magazine Web site is now the destination to discover fantastic original video - the kind of short films you cannot find anywhere else, on or off line...T Takes, by the talented Brody Baker, reflects what the T community online is all about: discovering what is new and hot in stylized online storytelling." Horacio Silva, the features director and online director of T magazine, further added "Just as the print version of T [magazine] has always had an unconventional relationship with the world of celebrity, we wanted to give our readers a fresh perspective on the new generation of film stars, and Brody [Baker] has truly accomplished that with the T Takes series ... Since the online launch of T [magazine] last fall, we have been experimenting with new ways to give our users interesting perspectives through video interviews and short films, and we will continue to bring our audience original features such as this series."

References

External links
Official Site
Official Trailer
 
 
 
 
 
 
 
 
 
 
 
 
The New York Times T Style Magazine Web Site

2008 independent films
Films set in Utah
2008 films
American independent films
2000s English-language films
2000s American films